Crassispira fuscescens is a species of sea snail, a marine gastropod mollusk in the family Pseudomelatomidae.

This species is similar to † Drillia fuscescens (Gray, 1843)

Description
The length of the shell varies between 10 mm and 25 mm.

The color of the shell is deep chocolate-brown. The longitudinal ribs commence abruptly and are separated by wider interspaces, crossed by revolving raised lines, forming granules in the keel. The whorls above the periphery are smooth and slightly concave, with a raised line next the suture. The outer lip is thickened. with a sharp edge and a broad sinus.

Distribution
This marine species occurs off the Florida Keys, USA, and from the West Indies to Brazil; fossils were found in Quaternary strata in Cuba; age range: 2.588 to 0.012 Ma

References

 Reeve, L. 1843. Monograph of the genus Pleurotoma Conchologia Iconica 1 pls. 1-18
 Absalão, R. S.; Pimenta, A. D. & Caetano, C. H. S. 2007. Turridae (Mollusca, Neogastropoda, Conoidea) coletados no litoral sudeste do Brasil, Programa REVIZEE “Score” Central. Biociências (On-line) 13: 19-47.

External links
 
 Rosenberg G., Moretzsohn F. & García E. F. (2009). Gastropoda (Mollusca) of the Gulf of Mexico, Pp. 579–699 in Felder, D.L. and D.K. Camp (eds.), Gulf of Mexico–Origins, Waters, and Biota. Biodiversity. Texas A&M Press, College Station, Texas
 MNHN: specimen
 De Jong K.M. & Coomans H.E. (1988) Marine gastropods from Curaçao, Aruba and Bonaire. Leiden: E.J. Brill. 261 pp. 
 

fuscescens
Gastropods described in 1843